The Phalangodidae are a family of harvestmen with about 30 genera and more than 100 described species, distributed in the Holarctic region.

It is not to be confused with the harvestman family Phalangiidae, which is in the suborder Eupnoi.

Name
The name of the type genus Phalangodes is derived from Ancient Greek , a line of soldiers in formation. This probably refers to the rows of pedipalpal spines.

Description
The pedipalps are armed with large spines. While some species have legs eight times the body length, others have shorter legs around twice the body length. Most species are yellowish to orange brown. Troglobitic (cave-dwelling) species are depigmented.

Distribution
More than two-thirds of the species occur in the western Nearctic, especially in California] with about 50 species in four endemic genera. About 10 species are known from the eastern Nearctic. Few occur in the Palearctic, with one species each in the Canary Islands and Japan, and about 20 species in the Mediterranean region.

Relationships
The family seems to be largely monophyletic, with the exceptions of a few genera such as Guerrobunus and Glennhuntia. Although the relationship of the Phalangodidae to other Grassatores is currently unresolved,  the family seems relatively basal inside the Grassatores.

Genera

The family Phalangodidae contains these genera:

 Alpazia Özdikmen & Kury, 2006 i c g
 Ausobskya Martens, 1972 g — Greece (four species)
 Banksula Roewer, 1949 i c g b — California (10 species)
 Bishopella Roewer, 1927 i c g b — southeastern US (two species)
 Bogania Forster, 1955 g
 Calicina Ubick & Briggs, 1989 i c g b — California (25 species)
 Chinquipellobunus C.J. Goodnight and M.L. Goodnight, 1944 i c g
 Crosbyella Roewer, 1927 i c g b — southeastern US (five species)
 Enigmina Ubick & Briggs, 2008 i c g b
 Glennhuntia Shear, 2001 — western Australia (one species; probably misplaced)
 Guerrobunus Goodnight & Goodnight, 1945 — Mexico (three species, probably misplaced)
 Haasus Roewer, 1949 g
 Lola Kratochvil, 1937 g — Israel (one species)
 Maiorerus Rambla, 1993 g — Canary Islands (one species)
 Megacina Ubick & Briggs, 2008 i c g b
 Microcina Briggs & Ubick, 1989 i c g b — California (six species)
 Microcinella Ubick & Briggs, 2008 i c g b
 Neoparalus Özdikmen, 2006 i c g
 Paralola Kratochvil, 1951 g — Bulgaria (one species)
 Phalangodes Tellkampf, 1844 i c g b — Kentucky, Cuba? (two species; one species possibly misplaced)
 Phalangomma Roewer, 1949 — Virginia (one species; probably misplaced)
 Proscotolemon Roewer, 1916 — Japan (one species)
 Ptychosoma Sørensen, 1873 — Spain, Italy, North Africa (two species)
 Scotolemon Lucas, 1860 g — Mediterranean (13 species)
 Sitalcina Banks, 1911 i c g b — California (9 species)
 Spalicus Roewer, 1949 i c g
 Texella C.J. Goodnight & M.L. Goodnight, 1942 i c g b — Texas, California, Oregon, New Mexico (28 species)
 Tolus C.J. Goodnight & M.L. Goodnight, 1942 i c g b — Tennessee (one species)
 Tularina Ubick & Briggs, 2008 i c g b
 Undulus C.J. Goodnight & M.L. Goodnight, 1942 i c g b — Alabama (one species)
 Wespus C.J. Goodnight & M.L. Goodnight, 1942 i c g b — Arkansas (one species)

Data sources: i = ITIS, c = Catalogue of Life, g = GBIF, b = Bugguide.net

References

Harvestmen
Harvestman families